The 2023 Yobe State gubernatorial election will take place on 18 March 2023, to elect the Governor of Yobe State, concurrent with elections to the Yobe State House of Assembly as well as twenty-seven other gubernatorial elections and elections to all other state houses of assembly. The election—which was postponed from its original 11 March date—will be held three weeks after the presidential election and National Assembly elections. Incumbent APC Governor Mai Mala Buni won re-election to a second term.

The primaries, scheduled for between 4 April and 9 June 2022, resulted in Buni being renominated by the All Progressives Congress unopposed on 26 May while the Peoples Democratic Party nominated Sharif Abdullahi—former Bade Local Government Chairman—on 25 May.

Electoral system
The Governor of Yobe State is elected using a modified two-round system. To be elected in the first round, a candidate must receive the plurality of the vote and over 25% of the vote in at least two-thirds of state local government areas. If no candidate passes this threshold, a second round will be held between the top candidate and the next candidate to have received a plurality of votes in the highest number of local government areas.

Background
Yobe State is a large, diverse northeastern state in the process of recovering from the worst of the Boko Haram insurgency. Still facing threats from Boko Haram and ISWAP, the state also has to contend with an underdeveloped yet vital agricultural sector, desertification, and low education rates.

Politically, the 2019 elections confirmed Yobe's status as one of the most staunchly APC states in the nation as both Buhari and Buni won the state by wide margins and every single legislative seat on the senatorial, house of representatives, and house of assembly levels were carried by APC nominees.

Over the course of Buni's term, his administration stated focuses included rebuilding the state's educational system, timely payment of civil servant salaries, and upgrading and repairing transportation infrastructure. However, Buni's political situation changed about 13 months into his term when he was appointed National Caretaker Chairman of All Progressives Congress; choosing to serve in the Abuja-based position while continuing as governor was controversial, even more so after he admitted to spending only "three or four days in Yobe" every month. Questioned by the PDP over the constitutionality of holding the second job, Buni remained at the helm of the APC until the party's March 2022 convention. After leaving office, analysts questioned if Buni could successfully return to his state after withdrawing to Abuja for nearly two years and, supposedly, lobbying to become the party's vice presidential nominee instead of returning to the governorship.

Primary elections
The primaries, along with any potential challenges to primary results, were to take place between 4 April and 3 June 2022 but the deadline was extended to 9 June.

All Progressives Congress 

On the primary date, Buni was the sole candidate and won the nomination unopposed. In his acceptance speech, Buni thanked the party while pledging to continue the work of his administration.

Nominated 
 Mai Mala Buni: Governor (2019–present) and APC Caretaker National Chairman (2020–present)
 Running mate—Idi Barde Gubana: Deputy Governor (2019–present)

Declined 
 Mohammed Hassan: former Senator for Yobe South (2015–2019)

Results

People's Democratic Party 

On primary day, three candidates contested an indirect primary at the August 27th Stadium in Damaturu that ended with Sharif Abdullahi emerging as the PDP nominee after results showed him winning about 55% of the delegates' votes.

Nominated 
 Sharif Abdullahi: businessman and former Bade Local Government Chairman (1991–1993)
 Running mate—Abubakar Bashir Sadiq

Eliminated in primary 
 Ali Adamu Tikau
 Abba Gana Tata: state PDP chairman

Declined 
 Umar Iliya Damagum: PDP Deputy National Chairman (North) (2020–present) and 2019 PDP gubernatorial nominee
 Aji Kolomi: 2019 APC gubernatorial candidate

Results

Minor parties 

 Mohammed Arabi (Action Alliance)
Running mate: Yahaya Lawan
 Adamu Umar (Action Democratic Party)
Running mate: Lawan Ibrahim
 Adamu Ahmed (Action Peoples Party)
Running mate: Adamu Isah Abubakar
 Mohammad Tilio Abdullahi (African Democratic Congress)
Running mate: Abdullahi Ahmadu
 Mohammed Bukar (Allied Peoples Movement)
Running mate: Musa Abubakar
 Muhammad Ahmed Yusufari (Labour Party)
Running mate: Salisu Abdulhamid Adaya
 Garba Umar (New Nigeria Peoples Party)
Running mate: Yahaya Abdullahi
 Audi Dalhatu (Social Democratic Party)
Running mate: Abdullahi Adamu
 Mohammed Maina (Young Progressives Party)
Running mate: Ari Gishuwa

Campaign
In the months after the primaries, analysts noted the relative weakness of the PDP in Yobe along with several major defections from the party as reasons it would be difficult to challenge the strong APC hold on the state. However, the PDP claimed Abdullahi had mass grassroots support and would shock the APC while the APC used infrastructural projects as evidence of Buni's impact during his term in office.

By 2023, attention largely switched to the presidential election on 25 February. In the election, Yobe State voted for Atiku Abubakar (PDP); Abubakar won 52.5% of the vote, beating Bola Tinubu (APC) at 40.0%. The result—which was labeled as an upset as projections had favored Tinubu—led to increased attention on the gubernatorial race and its potential competitiveness. Gubernatorial campaign analysis from after the presidential election noted that PDP had gained momentum from the presidential results while a surprised APC was renewing campaign efforts. Nevertheless, the EiE-SBM forecast projected Buni to win while a Vanguard piece predicted that Buni was favoured but "may need to work harder for re-election."

Projections

Conduct

Electoral timetable

General election

Results

By senatorial district 
The results of the election by senatorial district.

By federal constituency
The results of the election by federal constituency.

By local government area 
The results of the election by local government area.

See also 
 2023 Nigerian elections
 2023 Nigerian gubernatorial elections

Notes

References 

Yobe State gubernatorial election
2023
2023 Yobe State elections
Yobe